"Weight of the World" is a song by Swedish EDM trio Smilo. The song was released in Sweden as a digital download on 28 February 2016, and was written by Smilo along with Anton Göransson and Robin Danielsson. It took part in Melodifestivalen 2016, and placed fifth in the third semi-final.

Track listing

Chart performance

Release history

References

2015 songs
2016 singles
Melodifestivalen songs of 2016
Synth-pop ballads
Smilo songs
Universal Music Group singles
English-language Swedish songs